Naanu Nanna Kanasu is a 2010 Indian Kannada-language film directed by Prakash Raj, starring himself and Amoolya. It is a remake of the Tamil hit film Abhiyum Naanum (which was inspired by Father of the Bride) that was produced by Prakash Rai himself. Ramya was originally cast as the lead in the film, but she was later replaced by Amoolya. In Bangalore, the film ran in theatres for 17 consecutive weeks.

Plot
The movie is about a relationship between a father and his daughter. It emphasis on how a father has to go through changes as his daughter grows up from being an infant to a grown woman married as per circumstances.

Cast
 Prakash Rai as Raj Uthappa
 Amulya as Kanasu
 Sithara as Kalpana
 Ramesh Arvind as Jayanth
 Achyuth Kumar as Brijesh Patel
 Rajesh as Uthappa's friend
 Veena Sundar
 Sihi Kahi Chandru
 Ruthu
 Kawaljith Singh as Joginder Singh
 Manmeet Singh as Veerji

Soundtrack
The lyrics and the background scores of all the songs in the movie were composed by the music director Hamsalekha.

"Putta Putta" (Sonu Nigam)
"Ondu Maamara" (Kailash Kher)
"Mundooduva" (Sonu Nigam)
"Balukthalamma" (Shreya Ghoshal)

Reception

Critical response 

A critic from The Times of India gave the film four and a half stars out of five and wrote that "It is a must watch family movie for all age groups without a single dull moment". Shruti Indira Lakshminarayana of Rediff.com scored the film at 3.5 out of 5 stars and says "Ananth Urs has done a decent job with the camera and kudos to Harsha, the editor for presenting a crisp output. In fact some scenes from the original have been done away with and a few minor changes have been made to a few others, contributing to the ideal length of the film. Book your weekend show for Nannu Nanna Kanasu. It is a must father-daughter watch". A critic from The New Indian Express wrote "Prakash Raj as a concerned and possessive father is superb. His dialogue delivery and gestures deserve appreciation. It is a different role for Amulya, who is known for playing innocent characters. The actor who surprises everyone with his performance is Achyut. He has even acted well in an emotional song sequence"  B S Srivani from Deccan Herald wrote "That shouldn't be the case of the audience, who may discover some of the pleasures of plain, good old cinema. For, Prakash Raj’s “Kanasu” is the Kanasu of every father here". A critic from Bangalore Mirror wrote  "Laali, by Dinesh Baboo, was one film that explored the bond between a father and daughter. So, Naanu Nanna Kanasu is not a new subject for Sandalwood. Between the two, Laali is better. This film will entertain those bred on television soaps and make them realise that a story can be told in 150 minutes instead of years".

Notes

References

External links
 

2010 films
Father of the Bride (franchise)
2010s Kannada-language films
Films scored by Hamsalekha
Kannada remakes of Tamil films
Indian drama films
2010 directorial debut films
2010 drama films